Rose Bernd is a 1919 German silent drama film directed by Alfred Halm and starring Henny Porten and Emil Jannings. It is based on the play of the same name by Gerhart Hauptmann. Porten won critical acclaim for her role in the film.

Cast
In alphabetical order
 Rudolf Biebrach as Untersuchungsrichter 
 Paul Bildt as August Keil 
 Ilka Grüning as Frau Flamm 
 Emil Jannings as Arthur Streckmann 
 Werner Krauss as Der alte Bernd 
 Max Maximilian 
 Henny Porten as Rose Bernd 
 Rigmore Toersleff as Martelli 
 Alexander Wirth as Christoph Flamm

References

Bibliography
 Hans-Michael Bock and Tim Bergfelder. The Concise Cinegraph: An Encyclopedia of German Cinema. Berghahn Books.

External links

1919 films
1919 drama films
German drama films
Films of the Weimar Republic
German silent feature films
Films based on works by Gerhart Hauptmann
Films directed by Alfred Halm
UFA GmbH films
German black-and-white films
Silent drama films
1910s German films
1910s German-language films